Macara heinrichi is a moth of the family Megalopygidae. It was described by Walter Hopp in 1928. It is found in South America.

References

Moths described in 1928
Megalopygidae